Yorktown Township is one of twenty-four townships in Henry County, Illinois, USA.  As of the 2010 census, its population was 431 and it contained 190 housing units.

Geography

Cities, towns, villages
 Hooppole

Unincorporated towns
 Aliceville at 
(This list is based on USGS data and may include former settlements.)

Adjacent townships
 Prophetstown Township, Whiteside County (north)
 Tampico Township, Whiteside County (northeast)
 Fairfield Township, Bureau County (east)
 Gold Township, Bureau County (southeast)
 Alba Township (south)
 Atkinson Township (southwest)
 Loraine Township (west)

Cemeteries
The township contains these two cemeteries: Hooppole and Saint Marys.

Major highways
  Illinois Route 78
  Illinois Route 92

Demographics

School districts
 Annawan Community Unit School District 226
 Geneseo Community Unit School District 228
 Prophetstown-Lyndon-Tampico Community Unit School District 3

Political districts
 Illinois's 14th congressional district
 State House District 90
 State Senate District 45

References
 United States Census Bureau 2008 TIGER/Line Shapefiles
 
 United States National Atlas

External links
 City-Data.com
 Illinois State Archives
 Township Officials of Illinois

Townships in Henry County, Illinois
Townships in Illinois